The Roman Catholic Diocese of Keetmanshoop is a suffragan diocese in the Latin rite Ecclesiastical province of the Metropolitan of Windhoek in Namibia, yet depends on the missionary Roman Congregation for the Evangelization of Peoples.

Its cathedral episcopal see is St. Stanislaus Cathedral, in the city of Keetmanshoop.

Statistics 
As per 2015, it pastorally served 42,570 Catholics (23.6% of 180,000 total population) on 264,110 km² in 11 parishes and 32 missions with 16 priests (3 diocesan, 13 religious), 13 deacons, 65 lay religious (17 brothers, 48 sisters) and 2 seminarists.

History 
 July 7, 1909: Established as Apostolic Prefecture of Great Namaqualand, on territory split off from the then Apostolic Vicariate of Orange River in South Africa
 Promoted on July 14, 1930 as Apostolic Vicariate of Great Namaqualand
 January 13, 1949: Renamed after its see as Apostolic Vicariate of Keetmanshoop
 Promoted on March 14, 1994 as Diocese of Keetmanshoop

Bishops 
(all Roman rite, so far members of a missionary congregation)

Apostolic Prefects of Great Namaqualand  
 Fr. Stanislaus von Krolikowski, O.S.F.S. (1910 – death 1923.01.21)
 Fr. Mattias Eder, O.S.F.S. (1923.03.16 – death 1930)

Apostolic Vicars of Great Namaqualand  
 Joseph Klemann, O.S.F.S. (1931.02.24 – retired 1942), Titular Bishop of Drusiliana (1931.02.24 – death 1960.03.21)
 John Francis Eich, O.S.F.S. (1942.11.10 – death 1947.02.04), Titular Bishop of Cynopolis in Ægypto (1942.04.21 – 1947.02.04), succeeded as former Coadjutor Vicar Apostolic of Great Namaqualand (1942.04.21 – 1942.11.10)

Apostolic Vicars of Keetmanshoop 
 Francis Esser, O.S.F.S. (1949.01.13 – 1956), Titular Bishop of Claneus (1949.01.13 – 1962.09.12), next Coadjutor Bishop of Keimoes (South Africa) (1956 – 1962.09.12), succeeding as Bishop of Keimoes (South Africa) (1962.09.12 – death 1966.12.08)
 Edward Francis Joseph Schlotterback, O.S.F.S. (1956.03.24 – retired 1989.10.02), Titular Bishop of Balanea (1956.03.24 – death 1994.12.09)
Apostolic Administrator Father Ludger G. Holling, O.S.F.S. (1989 – 1993.05.28), no other prelature
 Anthony Chiminello, O.S.F.S. (1993.05.28 – 1994.03.14 see below), Titular Bishop of Numana (1993.05.28 – 1994.03.14)Suffragan Bishops of Keetmanshoop 
 Anthony Chiminello, O.S.F.S. (see above'' 1994.03.14 – death 2002.11.23)
 Phillip Pöllitzer, O.M.I. (2007.05.31 – retired 2017.07.21)
 Willem Christiaans, O.S.F.S. (2018.02.07 – ...); no previous prelature.

Coadjutor Bishop
John Francis Eich, O.S.F.S. (1942)

See also 
 List of Catholic dioceses in Namibia
 Roman Catholicism in Namibia

Sources and External links 
 GCatholic.org
 Catholic Hierarchy
 Diocese of Keetmanshoop website 

Roman Catholic dioceses in Namibia
Religious organizations established in 1909
Keetmanshoop
Roman Catholic dioceses and prelatures established in the 20th century
Roman Catholic Ecclesiastical Province of Windhoek